Evan Lionel Richard Osnos (born December 24, 1976) is an American journalist and author. He has been a staff writer at The New Yorker since 2008, best known for his coverage of politics and foreign affairs, in the United States and China. His 2014 book, Age of Ambition: Chasing Fortune, Truth, and Faith in the New China, won the National Book Award for nonfiction. In October 2020, he published a biography of Joe Biden, entitled Joe Biden: The Life, the Run, and What Matters Now. In September 2021, he published Wildland: The Making of America's Fury, about profound cultural and political changes occurring between September 11, 2001, and January 6, 2021, as evidenced by the turmoil of 2020.

Life and career
Osnos was born in London, when his parents, Susan (née Sherer) Osnos and Peter L.W. Osnos, were visiting from Moscow, where his father was assigned as a correspondent for The Washington Post. His father was a Jewish refugee from Poland born in India when his family was en route to the U.S. His mother was the daughter of diplomat Albert W. Sherer Jr. Osnos graduated from Greenwich High School in 1994. He then attended Harvard University where he graduated magna cum laude in 1998 with a Bachelor of Arts in government.

In the summer of 1999, Osnos joined the Chicago Tribune as a metro reporter, and, later, a national and foreign correspondent. He was based in New York at the time of the September 11 attacks. In 2002, he was assigned to the Middle East, where he covered the Iraq War and reported from Egypt, Saudi Arabia, Syria, Iran, and elsewhere. In 2005, he became the China correspondent. He was a guest on the Colbert Report in 2007 and 2011 to discuss China's changes. He was part of a Chicago Tribune team that won the 2008 Pulitzer Prize for Investigative Reporting.

Osnos joined The New Yorker in September 2008 and served as the magazine's China correspondent until 2013. Osnos has contributed to the NPR radio show This American Life and the PBS television show Frontline. As The New Yorker's China correspondent, Evan maintained a regular blog called "Letter from China" and wrote articles about China's young neoconservatives, the Fukushima nuclear meltdown, and the Wenzhou train crash. According to The Washington Post, "In the pages of the New Yorker, Evan Osnos has portrayed, explained and poked fun at this new China better than any other writer from the West or the East." He received two awards from the Overseas Press Club and the Osborn Elliott Prize for excellence in journalism from the Asia Society.

Age of Ambition: Chasing Fortune, Truth, and Faith in the New China (2014), Osnos' first book, follows the lives of individuals swept up in China's "radical transformation", Osnos said, in an interview on Fresh Air in June 2014. He said Communist Party leaders abandoned "the scripture of socialism and they held on to the saints of socialism." In addition to the National Book Award, the book was a finalist for the Pulitzer Prize in nonfiction. Osnos left China in 2013, to write about politics and foreign affairs at The New Yorker. Among other topics, he examined the politics behind a chemical leak in West Virginia and twice profiled Vice President Joe Biden, which became the basis for a book. According to Publishers Weekly, his book, Joe Biden constituted "a portrait of the candidate that's smart and evocative."

Wildland: The Making of America's Fury (2021) follows three dissimilar communities in the US and demonstrates how their interconnections reveal "seismic changes in American politics and culture." The book, a New York Times bestseller, focused on a period of political dissolution bounded by the terrorist attacks of 2001 and the assault on the capitol on January 6, 2021.

Personal life
Osnos is married to Sarabeth Berman, a graduate of Barnard College. Since July 2013, they have lived in Washington, D.C. with their two children. Osnos' Chinese name is 欧逸文 (Ōu Yìwén). His father, Peter Osnos, is founder and editor-at-large of PublicAffairs, a publishing company.

Books

References

External links

 
 Biography and list of articles, at The New Yorker
 Appearances on C-SPAN
 

Living people
Harvard University alumni
1976 births
American male journalists
American war correspondents
Chicago Tribune people
The New Yorker staff writers
War correspondents of the Iraq War
National Book Award winners
American people of Polish-Jewish descent
Pulitzer Prize for Investigative Reporting winners
Jewish American journalists
Livingston Award winners for International Reporting
Greenwich High School alumni